Hengu or Hongu in Iran may refer to:
 Hengu, Fars
 Hongu, Hormozgan
 Hengu, Kerman